Loop is a 2020 American computer-animated drama short film directed and written by Erica Milsom with the story being written by Adam Burke, Matthias De Clercq and Milsom, produced by Pixar Animation Studios, and distributed by Walt Disney Studios Motion Pictures. It is the sixth short film in Pixar's SparkShorts program and focuses on a non-verbal autistic girl and a chatty boy, learning to understand each other. The short was released on Disney+ on January 10, 2020.

Plot
Renee, a 13-year-old non-verbal autistic girl, sits in a canoe while playing with a sound app on her phone. Marcus arrives late and the camp counselor partners him with Renee, much to his annoyance. When Marcus attempts to show off his paddling skills, Renee is unimpressed and starts rocking the boat. Marcus asks her what she wants and she has him paddle to land so she can touch the reeds. 

When Renee goes back to her phone. Marcus has an idea. He paddles them to a tunnel and has Renee play her phone so that the sound can reverberate. At first, she enjoys it. Then a speedboat races by and the sound of that boat reverberates, overwhelming Renee. She frantically paddles out of the tunnel, nearly colliding with the speedboat in the process. When they crash onto land, Renee has a meltdown and throws her phone, which falls into the lake. Sobbing, she hides under the canoe while Marcus watches this unfold in bewilderment.

Eventually, Marcus pulls up a reed and places it next to the canoe where Renee can see it. He sits nearby until Renee calms down. She sits up, takes the reed, and begins to giggle. The two repeat the sound that the phone made together. The two of them get back into the canoe and paddle back to the camp.

In a post-credits scene, Renee's recovered phone is resting in a bowl of rice and it receives a message from Marcus asking if she wants to go canoeing again.

Cast
 Madison Bandy as Renee
 Christiano (Chachi) Delgado as Marcus
 Louis Gonzales as Camp Counselor

Additional voice cast
 Asher Brodkey
 Erica Milsom

Production 
Loop was directed and written by Erica Milsom, with a story created by Adam Burke, Erica Milsom and Matthias De Clercq. Michael Warch and Krissy Cababa produced the short.

The team brought in consultants from the Autistic Self Advocacy Network to ensure that Renee's portrayal would be authentic.

Loop features Madison Bandy in the role of Renee, who herself is non-speaking and autistic. The audio recording for her voice performance was done by Vince Caro, on location in her home, as part of an effort to make the recording process as comfortable as possible.

The director and animators on Loop spoke with the consultants to gain a sense of the way that a non-speaking person might communicate their feelings differently. They then developed a gestural language for Renee, equating specific behaviors, like holding her ears, or poking her cell phone, with specific emotional states.

Music
Mark Orton composed the music for Loop. The score was released on February 28, 2020.

Track listing

Release
Loop was released on Disney+ on January 10, 2020.

Reception
Loop received mostly positive reviews. Reviewers commented on its decision to portray the world through Renee's eyes. Jonathon Briggs wrote "By training our eyes to imagine what the world might look like from someone else's perspective, Loop encourages us to practice empathy in what feels like an increasingly divisive and judgmental world."

The autistic community responded enthusiastically to Loop. Autistic people on Twitter expressed excitement prior to the film's release. Autistic reviewers praised the portrayal of Renee for being positive and authentic.

Loop won the SIGGRAPH 2020 Computer Animation Festival Electronic Theater Best in Show-winning award in 2021.

It was also nominated that year for an NAACP Image Award.

References

External links
 
 

2020s animated short films
2020s Disney animated short films
2020 computer-animated films
2020 drama films
2020s English-language films
2020 short films
American animated short films
Films about autism
Films about summer camps
Films scored by Mark Orton
SparkShorts
Films about disability